Can Temel (born 1 October 1991) is a German lightweight rower. He won a gold medal at the 2014 World Rowing Championships in Amsterdam with the lightweight men's eight.

References

1991 births
Living people
German male rowers
World Rowing Championships medalists for Germany